The Herecomesthebride Stakes is a Grade III American Thoroughbred horse race for three year old fillies, over a distance of one mile on the turf held annually in March at Gulfstream Park, Hallandale Beach, Florida.  The event currently carries a purse of $200,000.

History

The inaugural running of the event was split into two divisions as the eight and ninth race in the program on 9 May 1984.

The event was named after the winning mare Herecomesthebride who  in her career won twelve races from sixteen starts including the 1977 Bonnie Miss Stakes (now the Grade II Gulfstream Oaks).

The event was not held in 1990 and 1991. The event was upgraded to  Grade III in 1998.  

The event was not held in 2008.

However, the 2015 running was switched to dirt due to weather conditions and was ungraded.

Of the more notable winners of this event was Dayatthespa. During her three-year-old campaign she began winning this event and four more including the Grade I Queen Elizabeth II Challenge Cup. Later in her career she would win the Breeders' Cup Filly & Mare Turf and be crowned US Champion Female Turf Horse.

Records
Speed record: 
  miles –	1:40:78 Dream Dancing (IRE) (2017)
  miles – 1:46.49  Auntie Mame (1997)

Margins:
  lengths – Cut the Charm  (1994)

Most wins by a jockey
 5 – Jerry D. Bailey (1996, 1997, 1999, 2000, 2001)

Most wins by a trainer
 3 – H. Graham Motion (2011, 2013, 2018)

Most wins by an owner
 2 – Augustin Stable (2011, 2013)

Winners 

Legend:

 
 

Notes:
† The favorite Spanish Loveaffair was first past the post but was disqualified and placed fourth for interference into the far turn. Con Lima was declared the winner.

See also
 List of American and Canadian Graded races

External links
 2020–21 Gulfstream Park Media Guide

References

Recurring sporting events established in 1984
Horse races in Florida
Gulfstream Park
Flat horse races for three-year-old fillies
Turf races in the United States
Graded stakes races in the United States
Grade 3 stakes races in the United States
1984 establishments in Florida